Ward No. 1 Dhaka North City Corporation is an administrative division of Dhaka North City Corporation in zone 1. It's located in Uttara police station of Dhaka City. It forms a city corporation council electoral constituency and is a part of Bangladesh Jatiyo Sangshad constituency Dhaka-18.

Overview 
The ward covers Uttora Model Town area in Dhaka. The boundaries of the ward are: Dhakshinkhan is in the east, Horirampur Union is in the west, Tongi Brige is in the north and international airport is in the south.

Election highlights

References

External links 
 Official website

Ward No. 1 (DNC)
Areas under Dhaka-18 constituency